Diesel is a 1942 German biographical film directed by Gerhard Lamprecht and starring Willy Birgel, Hilde Weissner, and Paul Wegener. It portrays the life of Rudolf Diesel, the German inventor of the diesel engine. It was one of a series of prestigious biopics made in Nazi Germany portraying genius inventors or artists struggling against the societies in which they live. The film was based on a biography by Eugen Diesel, one of Diesel's children.

It was shot at the Babelsberg Studios in Berlin. The film's sets were designed by art director Erich Kettelhut.

Cast

References

Bibliography

External links 
 

1942 films
1940s biographical drama films
1940s historical drama films
Films of Nazi Germany
German biographical drama films
German historical drama films
1940s German-language films
Films directed by Gerhard Lamprecht
Films set in the 1900s
Films set in the 1910s
Films set in the 19th century
Films about technology
UFA GmbH films
Films shot at Babelsberg Studios
German black-and-white films
1942 drama films
1940s German films